A single-lens reflex camera (SLR) is a camera that typically uses a mirror and prism system (hence "reflex" from the mirror's reflection) that permits the photographer to view through the lens and see exactly what will be captured. With twin lens reflex and rangefinder cameras, the viewed image could be significantly different from the final image. When the shutter button is pressed on most SLRs, the mirror flips out of the light path, allowing light to pass through to the light receptor and the image to be captured.

History 

Prior to the development of SLR, all cameras with viewfinders had two optical light paths: one path through the lens to the film, and another path positioned above (TLR or twin-lens reflex) or to the side (rangefinder). Because the viewfinder and the film lens cannot share the same optical path, the viewing lens is aimed to intersect with the film lens at a fixed point somewhere in front of the camera. This is not problematic for pictures taken at a middle or longer distance, but parallax causes framing errors in close-up shots. Moreover, focusing the lens of a fast reflex camera when it is opened to wider apertures (such as in low light or while using low-speed film) is not easy.

Most SLR cameras permit upright and laterally correct viewing through use of a roof pentaprism situated in the optical path between the reflex mirror and viewfinder. Light, which comes both horizontally and vertically inverted after passing through the lens, is reflected upwards by the reflex mirror, into the pentaprism where it is reflected several times to correct the inversions caused by the lens, and align the image with the viewfinder. When the shutter is released, the mirror moves out of the light path, and the light shines directly onto the film (or in the case of a DSLR, the CCD or CMOS imaging sensor). The Canon Pellix, along with several special purpose high speed cameras(such as the Canon EOS-1N RS), were an exception to the moving mirror system, wherein the mirror was a fixed beamsplitting pellicle.

Focus can be adjusted manually by the photographer or automatically by an autofocus system. The viewfinder can include a matte focusing screen located just above the mirror system to diffuse the light. This permits accurate viewing, composing and focusing, especially useful with interchangeable lenses.

Up until the 1990s, SLR was the most advanced photographic preview system available, but the recent development and refinement of digital imaging technology with an on-camera live LCD preview screen has overshadowed SLR's popularity. Nearly all inexpensive compact digital cameras now include an LCD preview screen allowing the photographer to see what the CCD is capturing. However, SLR is still popular in high-end and professional cameras because they are system cameras with interchangeable parts, allowing customization. They also have far less shutter lag, allowing photographs to be timed more precisely. Also the pixel resolution, contrast ratio, refresh rate, and color gamut of an LCD preview screen cannot compete with the clarity and shadow detail of a direct-viewed optical SLR viewfinder.

Large format SLR cameras were probably first marketed with the introduction of C.R. Smith's Monocular Duplex (U.S., 1884). SLRs for smaller exposure formats were launched in the 1920s by several camera makers. The first 35 mm SLR available to the mass market, Leica's PLOOT reflex housing along with a 200 mm f4.5 lens paired to a 35 mm rangefinder camera body, debuted in 1935. The Soviet Спорт (“Sport”), also a 24 mm by 36 mm image size, was prototyped in 1934 and went to market in 1937. K. Nüchterlein's Kine Exakta (Germany, 1936) was the first integrated 35 mm SLR to enter the market. Additional Exakta models, all with waist-level finders, were produced up to and during World War II. Another ancestor of the modern SLR camera was the Swiss-made Alpa, which was innovative, and influenced the later Japanese cameras. The first eye-level SLR viewfinder was patented in Hungary on August 23, 1943, by Jenő Dulovits, who then designed the first 35 mm camera with one, the Duflex, which used a system of mirrors to provide a laterally correct, upright image in the eye-level viewfinder. The Duflex, which went into serial production in 1948, was also the world's first SLR with an instant-return (a.k.a. autoreturn) mirror.

The first commercially produced SLR that employed a roof pentaprism was the Italian Rectaflex A.1000, shown in full working condition on Milan fair April 1948 and produced from September the same year, thus being on the market one year before the east German Zeiss Ikon VEB Contax S, announced on May 20, 1949, produced from September.

The Japanese adopted and further developed the SLR. In 1952, Asahi developed the Asahiflex and in 1954, the Asahiflex IIB. In 1957, the Asahi Pentax combined the fixed pentaprism and the right-hand thumb wind lever. Nikon, Canon and Yashica introduced their first SLRs in 1959 (the F, Canonflex, and Pentamatic, respectively).

Through-the-lens light metering 

As a small matter of history, the first 35 mm camera (non-SLR) to feature through the lens light metering may have been Nikon, with a prototype rangefinder camera, the SPX. According to the website below, the camera used Nikon 'S' type rangefinder lenses.

Through-the-lens light metering is also known as "behind-the-lens metering". In the SLR design scheme, there were various placements made for the metering cells, all of which used CdS (Cadmium sulfide) photocells. The cells were either located in the pentaprism housing, where they metered light transmitted through the focusing screen; underneath the reflex mirror glass itself, which was Topcon's design; or in front of the shutter mechanism, which was the design used by Canon with their Canon Pellix.

Pentax was the first manufacturer to show an early prototype 35 mm behind-the-lens metering SLR camera, which was named the Pentax Spotmatic. The camera was shown at the 1960 photokina show. However, the first Through-the-lens (TTL) light metering SLR on the market was the 1963 Topcon RE Super, which had the CdS metering cell placed behind the reflex mirror. The mirror had narrow slits cut into the surface to let the light reach the cell providing average metering. Late in the following year, a production model of the Pentax Spotmatic was shown whose CdS light meter cells were on the pentaprism, reading the light off the focusing screen providing average reading, yet keeping the Spotmatic name, but now written in one word. Another clever design appeared in 1965, the Canon Pellix employing a pellicle mirror that is semi-transparent, placing the meter cell on an arm swinging into the lightpass behind the mirror for meter reading.

Mamiya Sekor came out with cameras such as the Mamiya Sekor TL and various other versions. Yashica introduced the TL Super. Both of these cameras used M42 screw thread lenses as did the Pentax Spotmatic. Later on Fujica introduced their ST-701, then ST-801 and ST-901 cameras. The ST-701 was the first SLR to use a silicon cell photodiode, which was more sensitive than CdS and was immune to the memory effect that the CdS cell suffered from in bright sunlight. Gradually, other 35 mm SLR camera manufacturers changed their behind-the-lens meters from CdS cells to Silicon Diode photocells.

Other manufacturers responded and introduced their own behind-the-lens metering cameras. Nikon and Miranda, at first, simply upgraded their interchangeable pentaprisms to include behind-the-lens metering (for Nikon F, and Miranda D, F, Fv and G models) and these manufacturers also bought out other camera models with built-in behind-the-lens metering capability, such as the Nikkormat FT and the Miranda Sensorex (which used an external coupling diaphragm). Minolta introduced the SRT-101, which used Minolta's proprietary system they referred to as "CLC", which was an acronym for "contrast light compensation", which metered differently from an average metering behind-the-lens camera.

Some German manufacturers also introduced cameras such as the Zeiss Ikon Contarex family, which was one of very few 35 mm SLR to use interchangeable film backs.

Inexpensive leaf-shutter cameras also benefited from behind-the-lens metering as, Topcon introduced the Auto 100 with front-mount interchangeable lenses designed only for that camera, and one of the Zeiss Ikon Contaflex leaf shutter cameras. Kowa manufactured their SET-R, which had similar specifications.

Within months, manufacturers decided to bring out models that provided limited area metering, such as Nikon's Photomic Tn finder, which concentrated 60% of the CdS cells sensitivity on the inner circle of the focusing screen and 30% on the surrounding area. Canon used spot metering in the unusual Canon Pellix camera, which also had a stationary mirror system that allowed approximately 70% of the light to travel to the film plane and 30% to the photographer's eye. This system, unfortunately, degraded the native resolution of the attached lens and provided less illumination to the eyepiece. It did have the advantage of having less vibration than other SLR cameras but this was not sufficient to attract professionals to the camera in numbers.

Semi-automatic exposure capabilities 
While auto-exposure was commonly used in the early 1960s with various 35 mm fixed lens rangefinder cameras such as the Konica Auto 'S', and other cameras such as the Polaroid Land cameras whose early models used selenium cell meters, auto-exposure for interchangeable lens SLRs was a feature that was largely absent, except for a few early leaf-shutter SLRs such as the Kowa SE-R and Topcon Auto 100.

The types of automation found in some of these cameras consisted of the simple programmed shutter, whereby the camera's metering system would select a mechanically set series of apertures with shutter speeds, one setting of which would be sufficient for the correct exposure. In the case of the above-mentioned Kowa and Topcon, automation was semi-automatic, where the camera's CDs meter would select the correct aperture only.

Autoexposure, technically known as semi-automatic exposure, where the camera's metering system chooses either the shutter speed or the aperture, was finally introduced by the Savoyflex and popularized by Konishiroku in the 1965 Konica Auto-Reflex. This camera was of the 'shutter-priority' type automation, which meant that the camera selected the correct aperture automatically. This model also had the interesting ability to photograph in 35 mm full-frames or half-frames, all selected by a lever.

Other SLRs soon followed, but because of limitations with their lens mounts, the manufacturers of these cameras had to choose 'aperture-priority' automation, where the camera's metering system selects the correct shutter speed. As one example, Pentax introduced the Electro Spotmatic, which was able to use the then considerable bulk of 42 mm screw-mount lenses produced by various manufacturers. Yashica, another screw-mount camera manufacturer, soon followed.

Canon, which produced the FD lens mount (known as the breech-mount; a unique lens mounting system that combines the advantages of screw-mount and bayonet-mount) introduced their shutter priority 35 mm SLR, the Canon EF in 1976 or so. This camera's build quality was almost the equal of their flagship camera, the Canon F1, and featured a copal-square vertically travelling focal plane shutter that could synchronize electronic flash at shutter speeds up to and including 1/125 of a second, thus making this a good second-body camera for the professional photographer.

Nikon at first produced an aperture-priority camera, but later made subtle changes on the inside of their bayonet mount, which allowed for shutter-priority automation without obsoleting the photographers lenses.

Full-program auto-exposure 

Full-program auto-exposure soon followed with the advent of the Canon A-1 in 1978. This SLR had a 'P' mode on the shutter speed dial, and a lock on the aperture ring to allow the lens to be put on 'Auto' mode. Other manufacturers soon followed with Nikon introducing the FA, Minolta introducing the X-700 in 1981, and Pentax introducing the Super Program. Olympus, however, continued with 'aperture-priority' automation in their OM system line.

The 1970s and 1980s saw steadily increasing use of electronics, automation, and miniaturization, including integrated motor driven film advance with the Konica FS-1 in 1979, and motor rewind functions.

Autofocus 

The first autofocus 35 mm SLR was the Pentax ME-F released in 1981.

The Minolta Maxxum 7000, released in 1985, was the first 35 mm SLR with integrated autofocus and motorized film-advance winder, which became the standard configuration for SLR cameras from then on. This development had significant impact on the photographic industry.

Some manufacturers discarded their existing lens systems to compete with other manufacturer's autofocus capability in their new cameras. This was the case for Canon, with its new EOS lens line. Other manufacturers chose to adapt their existing lens systems for autofocus capability, as was the case with Nikon and Pentax. This allowed photographers to continue using their existing lenses, which greatly reduced the cost of upgrading. For example, almost all Nikon lenses from the 1960s and later still function on the current Nikon bodies, only lacking autofocus. Still some manufacturers, notably Leica with its R-system lenses, and Contax with its Zeiss lenses, decided to keep their lens mounts non-autofocus.

From the late 1980s competition and technical innovations made 35 mm camera systems more versatile and sophisticated by adding more advanced light metering capabilities such as spot-metering; limited area metering such as used by Canon with the F1 series; matrix metering as used by Nikon, exposure communication with dedicated electronic flash units. The user interface also changed on many cameras, replacing meter needle displays that were galvanometer-based and thereby fragile, with light-emitting diodes (LEDs) and then with more comprehensive liquid crystal displays (LCDs) both in the SLR viewfinder and externally on the cameras' top plate using an LCD screen. Wheels and buttons replaced the shutter dial on the camera and the aperture ring on the lens on many models, although some photographers still prefer shutter dials and aperture rings. Some manufacturers introduced image stabilization on certain lenses to combat camera shake and to allow longer hand-held exposures without using a tripod. This feature is especially useful with long telephoto lenses.

Digital SLRs 

Canon, Nikon and Pentax have all developed digital SLR cameras (DSLRs) using the same lens mounts as on their respective film SLR cameras. Konica Minolta did the same, and after having bought Konica Minolta's camera division in 2006 Sony continue using the Minolta AF lens mount in their DSLRs, including cameras built around a semi-transparent fixed mirror. Samsung builds DSLRs based on the Pentax lens mount. Olympus, on the other hand, chose to create a new digital-only Four Thirds System SLR standard, adopted later by Panasonic and Leica.

Contax came out with a DSLR model, the Contax N-Digital. This model was too late and too expensive to be competitive with other camera manufacturers. The Contax N-digital was the last Contax to use that maker's lens system, and the camera, while having impressive features such as a full-frame sensor, was expensive and lacked sufficient write-speed to the memory card for it to be seriously considered by some professional photographers.

The digital single-lens reflex camera have largely replaced film SLRs design in convenience, sales and popularity at the start of 21st century.

Optical components 

A cross-section (or 'side-view') of the optical components of a typical SLR camera shows how the light passes through the lens assembly (1), is reflected by the mirror (2) placed at a 45-degree angle, and is projected on the matte focusing screen (5). Via a condensing lens (6) and internal reflections in the roof pentaprism (7) the image appears in the eyepiece (8). When an image is taken, the mirror moves upwards from its resting position in the direction of the arrow, the focal plane shutter (3) opens, and the image is projected onto the film or sensor (4) in exactly the same manner as on the focusing screen.

This feature distinguishes SLRs from other cameras as the photographer sees the image composed exactly as it will be captured on the film or sensor (see Advantages below).

Pentaprisms and penta-mirrors 

Most 35 mm SLRs use a roof pentaprism or penta-mirror to direct the light to the eyepiece, first used on the 1948 Duflex constructed by Jenő Dulovits and patented August 1943 (Hungary). With this camera also appeared the first Instant-return mirror.
The first Japanese pentaprism SLR was the 1955 Miranda T, followed by the Asahi Pentax, Minolta SR-2, Zunow, Nikon F and the Yashica Pentamatic. Some SLRs offered removable pentaprisms with optional viewfinder capabilities, such as the waist-level finder, the interchangeable sports finders used on the Canon F1 and F1n; the Nikon F, F2, F3, F4 and F5; and the Pentax LX.

Another prism design was the porro prism system used in the Olympus Pen F, the Pen FT, the Pen FV half-frame 35 mm SLR cameras. This was later used on the Olympus EVOLT E-3x0 series, the Leica Digilux 3 and the Panasonic DMC-L1.

A right-angle finder is available that slips onto the eyepiece of most SLRs and D-SLRs and allows viewing through a waist-level viewfinder. There is also a finder that provides EVF remote capability.

Shutter mechanisms

Focal-plane shutters 

Almost all contemporary SLRs use a focal-plane shutter located in front of the film plane, which prevents the light from reaching the film even if the lens is removed, except when the shutter is actually released during the exposure. There are various designs for focal plane shutters. Early focal-plane shutters designed from the 1930s onwards usually consisted of two curtains that travelled horizontally across the film gate: an opening shutter curtain followed by a closing shutter curtain. During fast shutter speeds, the focal-plane shutter would form a 'slit' whereby the second shutter curtain was closely following the first opening shutter curtain to produce a narrow, vertical opening, with the shutter slit moving horizontally. The slit would get narrower as shutter speeds were increased. Initially these shutters were made from a cloth material (which was in later years often rubberised), but some manufacturers used other materials instead. Nippon Kōgaku (now Nikon Corporation), for example, used titanium foil shutters for several of their flagship SLR cameras, including the Nikon F, F2, and F3.

Other focal-plane shutter designs, such as the Copal Square, travelled vertically — the shorter travelling distance of 24 millimetres (as opposed to 36 mm horizontally) meant that minimum exposure and flash synchronisation times could be reduced. These shutters are usually manufactured from metal, and use the same moving-slit principle as horizontally travelling shutters. They differ, though, in usually being formed of several slats or blades, rather than single curtains as with horizontal designs, as there is rarely enough room above and below the frame for a one-piece shutter. Vertical shutters became very common in the 1980s (though Konica, Mamiya, and Copal first pioneered their use in the 1950s and 1960s, and are almost exclusively used for new cameras. Nowadays most such shutters are manufactured from cheaper aluminium (though some high-end cameras use materials such as carbon-fibre and Kevlar).

Rotary focal-plane shutter 
One unusual design, the Olympus Pen half-frame 35 mm SLR system, manufactured by Olympus in Japan, used a rotary focal-plane shutter mechanism that was extremely simple and elegant in design. This shutter used titanium foil but consisted of one piece of metal with a fixed opening, which allowed electronic flash synchronisation up to and including its maximum speed of 1/500 of a second – rivalling the capabilities of leaf-shutter systems

Another 35 mm camera system that used a rotary shutter, was the Robot Royal cameras, most of which were rangefinder 35 mm cameras. Some of these cameras were full-frame; some were half-frame, and at least one Robot camera produced an unusual square-sized image on the 35 mm frame.

The Mercury II, produced in 1946, also used a rotary shutter. This was a half-frame 35 mm camera.

Leaf shutters 
Another shutter system is the leaf shutter, whereby the shutter is constructed of diaphragm-like blades and can be situated either between the lens or behind the lens. If the shutter is part of a lens assembly some other mechanism is required to ensure that no light reaches the film between exposures.

An example of a behind-the-lens leaf shutter is found in the 35 mm SLRs produced by Kodak, with their Retina Reflex camera line; Topcon, with their Auto 100; and Kowa with their SE-R and SET-R reflexes.

A primary example of a medium-format SLR with a between-the-lens leaf shutter system would be Hasselblad, with their 500C, 500 cm, 500 EL-M (a motorized Hasselblad) and other models (producing a 6 cm square negative). Hasselblads use an auxiliary shutter blind situated behind the lens mount and the mirror system to prevent the fogging of film.

Other medium-format SLRs also using leaf shutters include the now discontinued Zenza-Bronica camera system lines such as the Bronica ETRs, the ETRs'i (both producing a 6 × 4.5 cm. image), the SQ and the SQ-AI (producing a 6 × 6 cm image like the Hasselblad), and the Zenza-Bronica G system (6 × 7 cm). Certain Mamiya medium-format SLRs, discontinued camera systems such as the Kowa 6 and a few other camera models also used between-the-lens leaf shutters in their lens systems.

Thus, any time a photographer purchased one of these lenses, that lens included a leaf shutter in its lens mount.

Some manufacturers of medium-format 120 film SLR cameras also made leaf-shutter lenses for their focal-plane-shutter models. Rollei made at least two such lenses for their Rolleiflex SL-66 medium format which was a focal-plane shutter SLR. Rollei later switched to a camera system of leaf-shutter design (e.g., the 6006 and 6008 reflexes) and their current medium-format SLRs are now all of the between-the-lens shutter design.

Further developments 

Since the technology became widespread in the 1970s, SLRs have become the main photographic instrument used by dedicated amateur photographers and professionals. Some photographers of static subjects (such as architecture, landscape, and some commercial subjects), however, prefer view cameras because of the capability to control perspective. With a triple-extension bellows 4" × 5" camera such as the Linhof SuperTechnika V, the photographer can correct certain distortions such as "keystoning", where the image 'lines' converge (i.e., photographing a building by pointing a typical camera upward to include the top of the building). Perspective correction lenses are available in the 35 mm and medium formats to correct this distortion with film cameras, and it can also be corrected after the fact with photo software when using digital cameras. The photographer can also extend the bellows to its full length, tilt the front standard and perform photomacrography (commonly known as 'macro photography'), producing a sharp image with depth-of-field without stopping down the lens diaphragm.

Film formats 

Early SLRs were built for large format photography, but this film format has largely lost favor among professional photographers. SLR film-based cameras have been produced for most film formats as well as for digital formats. These film-based SLRs use the 35 mm format as, this film format offers a variety of emulsions and film sensitivity speeds, usable image quality and a good market cost. 35 mm film comes in a variety of exposure lengths: 20 exposure, 24 exposure and 36 exposure rolls. Medium format SLRs provide a higher-quality image with a negative that can be more easily retouched than the smaller 35 mm negative, when this capability is required.

A small number of SLRs were built for APS such as the Canon IX series and the Nikon Pronea cameras. SLRs were also introduced for film formats as small as Kodak's 110, such as the Pentax Auto 110, which had interchangeable lenses.

The Narciss camera is an all-metal 16 mm subminiature single lens reflex camera made by Russian optic firm Krasnogorsky Mekhanichesky Zavod (KMZ) Narciss (Soviet Union; Нарцисс) between 1961 and 1965.

Common features 

Other features found on many SLR cameras include through-the-lens (TTL) metering and sophisticated flash control referred to as "dedicated electronic flash". In a dedicated system, once the dedicated electronic flash is inserted into the camera's hot shoe and turned on, there is then communication between camera and flash. The camera's synchronization speed is set, along with the aperture. Many camera models measure the light that reflects off of the film plane, which controls the flash duration of the electronic flash. This is denoted TTL flash metering.

Some electronic flash units can send out several short bursts of light to aid the autofocus system or for wireless communication with off-camera flash units. A pre-flash is often used to determine the amount of light that is reflected from the subject, which sets the duration of the main flash at time of exposure. Some cameras also employ automatic fill-flash, where the flash light and the available light are balanced. While these capabilities are not unique to the SLR, manufacturers included them early on in the top models, whereas the best rangefinder cameras adopted such features later.

Advantages 
Many of the advantages of SLR cameras derive from viewing and focusing the image through the attached lens. Most other types of cameras do not have this function; subjects are seen through a viewfinder that is near the lens, making the photographer's view different from that of the lens. SLR cameras provide photographers with precision; they provide a viewing image that will be exposed onto the negative exactly as it is seen through the lens. There is no parallax error, and exact focus can be confirmed by eye—especially in macro photography and when photographing using long focus lenses. The depth of field may be seen by stopping down to the attached lens aperture, which is possible on most SLR cameras except for the least expensive models. Because of the SLR's versatility, most manufacturers have a vast range of lenses and accessories available for them.

This allows photographs to be taken in lower light conditions without flash, and allows a narrower depth of field, which is useful for blurring the background behind the subject, making the subject more prominent. "Fast" lenses are commonly used in theater photography, portrait photography, surveillance photography, and all other photography requiring a large maximum aperture.

The variety of lenses also allows for the camera to be used and adapted in many different situations. This provides the photographer with considerably more control (i.e., how the image is viewed and framed) than would be the case with a view camera. In addition, some SLR lenses are manufactured with extremely long focal lengths, allowing a photographer to be a considerable distance away from the subject and yet still expose a sharp, focused image. This is particularly useful if the subject includes dangerous animals (e.g., wildlife); the subject prefers anonymity to being photographed; or else, the photographer's presence is unwanted (e.g., celebrity photography or surveillance photography). Practically all SLR and DSLR camera bodies can also be attached to telescopes and microscopes via an adapter tube to further enhance their imaging capabilities.

Disadvantages 
In most cases, single-lens reflex cameras cannot be made as small or as light as other camera designs—such as rangefinder cameras, autofocus compact cameras and digital cameras with electronic viewfinders (EVF)—owing to the mirror box and pentaprism/pentamirror. The mirror box also prevents lenses with deeply recessed rear elements from being mounted close to the film or sensor unless the camera has a mirror lockup feature; this means that simple designs for wide angle lenses cannot be used. Instead, larger and more complex retrofocus designs are required.

The SLR mirror 'blacks-out' the viewfinder image during the exposure. In addition, the movement of the reflex mirror takes time, limiting the maximum shooting speed. The mirror system can also cause noise and vibration. Partially reflective (pellicle) fixed mirrors avoid these problems and have been used in a very few designs including the Canon Pellix and the Canon EOS-1N RS, but these designs introduce their own problems. These pellicle mirrors reduce the amount of light travelling to the film plane or sensor and also can distort the light passing through them, resulting in a less-sharp image. To avoid the noise and vibration, many professional cameras offer a mirror lock-up feature, however, this feature totally disables the SLR's automatic focusing ability. Electronic viewfinders have the potential to give the 'viewing-experience' of a DSLR (through-the-lens viewing) without many of the disadvantages. More recently, Sony have resurrected the pellicle mirror concept in their "single-lens translucent" (SLT) range of cameras.

Reliability 
SLRs vary widely in their construction and typically have bodies made of plastic or magnesium. Most manufacturers do not cite durability specifications, but some report shutter life expectancies for professional models. For instance, the Canon EOS 1Ds MkII is rated for 200,000 shutter cycles and the Nikon D3 is rated for 300,000 with its exotic carbon fiber/kevlar shutter. Because many SLRs have interchangeable lenses, there is a tendency for dust, sand and dirt to get into the main body of the camera through the mirror box when the lens is removed, thus dirtying or even jamming the mirror movement mechanism or the shutter curtain mechanism itself. In addition, these particles can also jam or otherwise hinder the focusing feature of a lens if they enter into the focusing helicoid. The problem of sensor cleaning has been somewhat reduced in DSLRs as some cameras have a built-in sensor cleaning unit.

Price and affordability 
The price of SLRs in general also tends to be somewhat higher than that of other types of cameras, owing to their internal complexity. This is compounded by the expense of additional components, such as flashes or lenses. The initial investment in equipment can be prohibitive enough to keep some casual photographers away from SLRs, although the market for used SLRs has become larger particularly as photographers migrate to digital systems.

Future 
The digital single-lens reflex camera has largely replaced the film SLR for its convenience, sales, and popularity at the start of 21st century. These cameras are currently the marketing favorite among advanced amateur and professional photographers. Film-based SLRs are still used by a niche market of enthusiasts and format lovers.

See also 
 Asahi Pentax
 Fujifilm
 Lenses for SLR and DSLR cameras
 Scheimpflug principle
 Zeiss Ikon

References

Further reading 
 Spira, S. F. The History of Photography as Seen through the Spira Collection. New York: Aperture, 2001. .
 Antonetto, Marco: "Rectaflex – The Magic Reflex". Nassa Watch Gallery, 2002.

External links 

 Photography in Malaysia's Contax History, Part II.
 'Innovative Cameras' by Massimo Bertacchi
 Rolleiflex SL 66 (Rolleiflex SL 66 Medium Format Single Lens Reflex camera).

Cameras by type
SLR cameras